World of Warcraft: Dragonflight is the ninth expansion pack for the massively multiplayer online role-playing game (MMORPG) World of Warcraft, following Shadowlands. It was announced in April 2022, and released on November 28, 2022.

Gameplay

The Dragon Isles are the main setting of Dragonflight, and are separated into five zones. The four main zones are the Waking Shores, Ohn'ahran Plains, Azure Span, and Thaldraszus, with the neutral city of Valdrakken in Thaldraszus serving as a hub (similarly to Oribos in Shadowlands). The fifth zone, the Forbidden Reach, also serves as the starting area for the Dracthyr race. 

Dragonflight raised the level cap to 70, the first increase since the level squish in Shadowlands. Dragonflight also features a revamp of the user interface and talent tree systems, with two tree branches.

Dragonflight includes a new playable race, the Dracthyr, and a new class, the Evoker. The two are combined: Evokers are exclusive to the Dracthyr, and are also the only class that Dracthyr can play. Wearing mail armor, Evokers have two specializations available to them: the ranged damage-focused Devastation and the healing-orientated Preservation. The Dracthyr can choose to align with either the Alliance or the Horde, similar to the Pandaren introduced in Mists of Pandaria. Dracthyr Evokers are also considered a hero class: they start at level 58 and have a unique starting zone.

Dragonflight features a revamp to the game's profession system, allowing players to place work orders where they can commission the creation of items. 

The game introduced a new feature called Dragonriding, allowing players to raise and customize a dragon that they will be able to use in a new momentum-based flight system using aerial skills. Flying is available from the start of the expansion, without the need to reach the maximum level.

Plot

Awakening the Isles
After being hidden for 10,000 years due to the War of the Ancients, the Dragon Isles, home to the Dragon Aspects and all dragon-kind, reveals itself on Azeroth. On the Isle, in an area known as the Forbidden Reach, a race of dragon-like warriors known as the dracthyr awaken from a 20,000 year slumber. Confused about their situation, they discover their storage was caused by their master, Neltharion (Deathwing), who feared the potential power they could possess if they weren't under his control. As they find their bearings, the dracthyr encounter enemy proto-dragons who wish to end the reign of the Aspects. In the ensuing battles, members of this Primalist regime release their leader, Raszageth the Storm-Eater, one of the four elemental Primal Incarnate Proto-dragons, who was sealed away by Neltharion as he gave in to the corruption of N'zoth millennia ago. Without their Black Dragonflight master, the dracthyr side with the Horde and Alliance to fight back against their ancient enemy and find their place in their new home.

Renewing the Flights
Upon the Horde and Alliance reaching the shores of the Dragon Isles, the situation is already dire. Enemies of old awaken just as the continent does itself, threatening the sanctums of the 5 dragonflights. The former Aspects of the flights also attempt to reawaken their inert power by relighting their own Oathstones, which went dormant upon the destruction of the Dragon Soul that led to Deathwing's downfall. 

The first sanctum in need of assistance is the Ruby Lifeshrine in the Waking Shores region, where the Aspect of Life Alexstrasza and her Red Flight attempt to keep unhatched eggs from becoming tainted with dark energies of the Primalists. Raszageth herself launches an assault on the shrine, but Azeroth's champions work with the dragons of the Ruby Lifeshrine to put an end to their offensive, with an unexpected assist coming from Wrathion. For his good deeds, he expects Alexstrasza to spare some manpower to assist him in reclaiming the nearby Obsidian Citadel, though she does not accept, choosing to protect the eggs instead.

Enlisting the aid of any who will beckon to his call, Wrathion charges into the Obsidian Citadel, where proto-dragons and other Primal loyalists have invaded his seat of power. Though heavily outmatched, the Black Prince is aided by a Black Dragon known as Sabellian, who returned to the Isle after heading the remaining black dragons in Outland that weren't corrupted by the Old Gods. The two ebony leaders work together to evict the remaining Primalists and rebuild their Oathstone, which had been destroyed when Neltharion fell into the clutches of the Old Gods. Returning to the Ruby Lifeshrine with new obsidian eggs, the Red Flight's Oathstone glows with power as well, though tension ensues as to who will lead the Black Dragonflight as Wrathion and Sabellian are both heirs of Neltharion.

Hearing word of unrest in the neighboring Ohn'ahran Plains, varying tribes of centaurs meet to remake a pact with the Green Dragonflight against the Primalists. However, the centaurs are betrayed by one of their own tribes, the Nokhud, who have accepted powers and allegiance to the Primalist army. The Green Dragonflight is caught unaware of the betrayal, costing Merithra, daughter of Ysera, one of her kin. Merithra and her emerald dragons work with the loyal centaur tribes to safeguard her Emerald Gardens from the encroaching dissenters, renewing the vows of companionship between all and empowering the Green Flight's Oathstone.

In the southern region known as the Azure Span, Kalecgos aims to revive the leylines of arcane magic to allow him to reclaim the dormant power as Aspect of the Blue Dragonflight and Magic, but due to the rot and decay of the land over the millennia, the magic appears unattainable. With the aid of a local Tuskarr tribe known as the Iskara, and under the guidance of the memory of Sindragosa, former consort of Malygos and Lich King Arthas's lead Frost Wyrm Queen, Kalecgos learns that the only way to re-establish his flight's power is through family, not magic. When Raszageth attempts to destroy Vakthros, the Blue Dragonflight's seat of power, Kalecgos defends it, and is joined by other blue dragons to protect their home and strengthen the bonds of their flight, returning power to their Oathstone.

In order to discover Raszageth's next move following her setbacks, Alexstrasza meets with Kalecgos and Nozdormu, Bronze Dragonflight Aspect of Time, in the Isle's capital city of Valdrakken within the nearby Thaldraszus region, home of the bronze flight. They discover multiple infiltrators have made their way into the city, showing the depth of the Primalist's schemes and how far they'd go to accomplish their seemingly unknown plans. At the Temporal Conflux, seat of power of the bronze flight, Chromie has an Infinite Dragon named Eternus captive. While clearing the citadel of enemy time-woven elementals, Eternus breaks free of their chains. As Chromie goes to intercept, they are both taken through a portal of history and time. Nozdormu sends champions through different points in the infinite timeways to locate them. After multiple periods in time, they are found in the ancient past when the Old Gods ruled Azeroth. Returning to the present, Nozdormu lets Eternus go and the Bronze Oathstone glows with power, though the Infinite Dragon warns the Aspect of his approaching fated transformation into Murozond, the leader of the Infinite Dragonflight.

Upon developing enough trust with groups scattered about the Isles, champions of Azeroth are able to learn more of the secrets the islands hold. In the Azure Span, the Iskara Tuskarr haven't heard from a fellow tribe in the Waking Shores known as the Uktulut for quite some time, so they send champions to discover why. They find out the Uktulut chieftain has been saddened by the loss of his hunting pet who was killed by Primal loyalists, but is able to overcome the grief by banding with his tribe to purge the Primalists from their area once and for all. Elsewhere, archaeologists of the Dragonscale Expedition come across a titan-forged door sealed by Keeper Tyr. After breaking the seal, they discover historical attributes of each of the five former Aspects, as well as detailed experiments Tyr conducted on proto-dragons by imbuing them with different elemental abilities. At the Emerald Gardens, members of the Green Dragonflight are deceived when a seemingly curious drakonid leads Primalists into the portal connecting to the Emerald Dream where Tyrande hid the world seed she was gifted by the Winter Queen of Ardenweald. To counter their assault, champions go to the Shadowlands to will Ysera back to life, but in exchange, Malfurion Stormrage takes her place in Ardenweald to serve her remaining time in the realm of death. With Ysera's return, the Primalists are evicted from the Dream, but she gives the mantle of returning Aspect to her daughter Merithra for keeping the Green Flight together in her absence.

With the 5 Oathstones back at full strength, Alextrasza begins a ritual in Valdrakken that will officially return the powers of the Aspects once more. However, the Mother Oathstone remains quiet and unresponsive, darkening any hope of their Aspectral awakening. Raszageth laughs and mocks Alexstrasza for her failure before turning away to the Vault of the Incarnates, where she plans to release other elemental Primal dragons from their captivity. Champions enter the Vault and battle the Storm Eater's minions, including Kurog Grimtotem, student of Magatha Grimtotem and the shaman that released Raszageth from her captivity on the Forbidden Reach. Finally, Raszageth herself falls in battle, but not before she is able to release the three other elemental Primal Incarnates of fire, ice water, and earth: Fyrakk the Blazing, Vyranoth the Frozenheart, and Iridikron the Stoneheart.

Setting
The game is set shortly after the events of Shadowlands, and largely takes place on the Dragon Isles, the ancestral homeland of the dragons. Over 20,000 years before World of Warcraft, the ancient ancestors of modern dragons, known simply as "proto-dragons", made a deal with a race of godlike beings known as the Titans, who empowered them with magic to transform them into the modern dragons. The dragons are divided into five dragonflights, distinct organizations each led by a powerful Dragon lord known as the Aspects, and include many dragon offshoots. These offshoots are called dragonkin, and include the Dracthyr, who can alternate between draconic and humanoid forms.

In the time after the rise of the Dragonflights, the remaining proto-dragons fell under the leadership of the Primalists, traditionalists who rejected the power of the Titans and sought to become the dominant power in Azeroth. The leaders of the Primalists, the Primal Incarnates, were sealed away by the Aspects. The ancient feud between the Aspects and the Primalists serves as the primary focus of the expansion's plot.

Reception

Dragonflight received "generally favorable" reviews with a score of 84 on Metacritic. PC Gamer scored the expansion 80/100, claiming that while the expansion wasn't "thrilling", it did feel like a "fresh start for a 20-year old videogame". Screen Rant described Dragonflight as "compelling" and "fantastic", scoring the game 9/10, though they noted that "for all the new...innovations, it's ultimately the same game underneath, for better or worse." Destructoid scored it 85/100, claiming that "As Legion took players out of the dour Warlords of Draenor, WoW has risen from the ashes once more", which has been sentiment shared by many outlets and fans alike compared to Shadowlands.

References

External links

2022 video games
Blizzard games
Massively multiplayer online role-playing games
MacOS games
Video games about dragons
Video games developed in the United States
Video games scored by Neal Acree
Warcraft games
Windows games
Dragonflight